Virgil Homer "Van" Rayburn (August 4, 1910 – June 15, 1991) was an American football end in the National Football League (NFL). Rayburn played college football for the Tennessee Volunteers of the University of Tennessee, where he was selected All-Southern. Rayburn was also selected a second-team All-American by the New York Sun. He played one year for the Brooklyn Dodgers.

References

1910 births
1991 deaths
Brooklyn Dodgers (NFL) players
American football ends
People from Pulaski, Tennessee
All-Southern college football players
Tennessee Volunteers football players
Players of American football from Tennessee